Surimana (Aymara for a sort of potatoes (white and long), also spelled Sorimana) is a mountain in the Wansu mountain range  in the Andes of Peru, about  high. It is situated in the Cusco Region, Chumbivilcas Province, Santo Tomás District. Surimana lies south of Uturunku, southwest of Wamanripa, and southeast of Waytani and Wansillu.

References 

Mountains of Peru
Mountains of Cusco Region